Leucosalpa is a genus of flowering plants belonging to the family Orobanchaceae.

Its native range is Madagascar.

Species:

Leucosalpa grandiflora 
Leucosalpa madagascariensis 
Leucosalpa poissonii

References

Orobanchaceae
Orobanchaceae genera